Gordon Stanley Cottington (2 April 1911 – 7 June 1996) was a Scottish rugby union and professional rugby league footballer who played in the 1930s and 1940s.

Background
Cottington was born in Kelso, Scottish Borders. He died aged 85 in Leeds, West Yorkshire, England.

Playing career

Rugby union

Rugby league
Cottington switched codes in 1936 to join rugby league side Castleford. He played in Castleford's victory in the Yorkshire County League during the 1938–39 season.

See also
 List of Scotland national rugby union players
 List of Scotland national rugby league team players

References
 Bath, Richard (ed.) The Scotland Rugby Miscellany (Vision Sports Publishing Ltd, 2007 )

External links
Search for "Cottington" at rugbyleagueproject.org

1911 births
1996 deaths
Castleford Tigers players
Footballers who switched code
Kelso RFC players
Rugby league hookers
Rugby league players from Kelso
Rugby union hookers
Rugby union players from Kelso
Scotland international rugby union players
Scottish rugby league players
Scottish rugby union players